Khushineh-ye Olya (also Romanized as Khūshīneh-ye ‘Olyā and Khūshīneh ‘Olyā; also known as Khūshīneh-ye Bālā, Khosinad Olya, and Khūshīneh Bālā) is a village in Kahshang Rural District, in the Central District of Birjand County, South Khorasan Province, Iran. At the 2016 census, its population was 73, in 26 families.

References 

Populated places in Birjand County